Serket  is the goddess of healing venomous stings and bites in Egyptian mythology, originally the deification of the scorpion. Her family life is unknown, but she is sometimes credited as the daughter of Neith and Khnum, making her a sister to Sobek and Apep.

Scorpion stings lead to paralysis and Serket's name describes this, as it means "(she who) tightens the throat"; however, Serket's name also can be read as meaning "(she who) causes the throat to breathe" and so, as well as being seen as stinging the unrighteous, Serket was seen as one who could cure scorpion stings and the effects of other venoms such as snakebites.

In the art of ancient Egypt, Serket was depicted as a scorpion (a symbol found on the earliest artifacts of the culture, such as from Naqada III) or to have the body of a scorpion but the head of a woman or as a woman with a scorpion on her head. Although Serket does not appear to have had any temples, she had a sizable number of priests in many communities.

One of the most dangerous species of scorpion, the deathstalker (Leiurus quinquestriatus) resides in North Africa and its sting may kill, so Serket was considered a highly important goddess and sometimes she was considered by pharaohs to be their patron. Her close association with the early rulers implies that she was their protector, notably Scorpion I and Scorpion II.

As the protector against venom and snakebite, Serket often was said to protect the deities from Apep, the great snake-demon of evil, sometimes being depicted as the guard when Apep was captured.

As many of the venomous creatures of Egypt could prove fatal, Serket also was considered a protector of the dead, particularly being associated with venoms and fluids causing stiffening. She was thus said to be the protector of the tents of embalmers and of the canopic jar associated with venom—the jar of the intestine—which was deified later as Qebehsenuef, one of the four sons of Horus.

As the guard of one of the canopic jars and a protector, Serket gained a strong association with Neith, Isis, and Nephthys, who also performed similar functions. Eventually, Serket began to be identified with Isis, sharing imagery and parentage, until finally, Serket was said to be merely an aspect of Isis, whose cult had become dominant.

It has been suggested that Serket's identification with a scorpion may be a misinterpretation of the determinative of her name and animal associated with her and that could refer not to a scorpion, but rather to a water scorpion (Nepidae). According to this hypothesis, Serket is referred to as "she who gives breath" because of the way water scorpions seem to breathe underwater. The appearance of a waterscorpion must have made it be associated with the scorpion, therefore the use of the goddess for curing scorpion stings and other venomous creatures or maybe exactly because she "causes to breathe", not for the physical similarities of the creatures.

Gallery

References

Further reading

Animal goddesses
Egyptian death goddesses
Health goddesses
Mythological arthropods
Naqada III
Scorpions in culture